Tesnus is a ghost town and unincorporated community in Brewster County, in the U.S. state of Texas.

History
Tesnus was laid out in 1882 when the Southern Pacific Railroad was extended to that point. Tesnus (sunset spelled backwards) was so named for the fact a sunset appeared in the logo of the Southern Pacific Railroad. A post office was established at Tesnus in 1912, and remained in operation until 1954.

Geology
Tesnus, Texas, is the namesake for the geological formation known either as the Tesnus Formation or Tesnus Shale. Bedrock outcrops around Tesnus, Texas serve as the type location for the Tesnus Formation.

The Upper Mississippian – Lower Pennsylvanian Tesnus Formation is a significant, wide-spread formation that is composed primarily of interbedded olive-drab to black shale, siltstone, and fine- to very fine-grained sandstone. Rare fossils of conodonts, radiolaria, sponge spicules, a crustacean, and inarticulate brachiopods have also been found in the Tesnus Formation.

The sediments comprising the Tesnus Formation accumulated within deep sea submarine fan and channel complexes. These sediments came dominantly from the southeast, likely from an approaching continental terrane that later collided with North America during the Ouachita orogeny. The Tesnus Formation and associated strata were folded into a northeast trending fold belt and thrust faulted northwestward by the Ouachita orogeny, which also formed the Ouachita Mountains of Arkansas and Oklahoma.

See also
 List of geographic names derived from anagrams and ananyms

References

Unincorporated communities in Brewster County, Texas
Unincorporated communities in Texas